Winchester Community High School is a public high school located in Winchester, Indiana, United States. The School serves the town of Winchester and surrounding area.

Athletics
Winchester Community High School's athletic teams are the Golden Falcons and they compete in the Tri-Eastern Conference. The Golden Falcon's primary rival is county foe  Union City High School. The school offers a wide range of athletics including:

Basketball (Men's and Women's)
Wrestling
Softball
Tennis (Men's & Women's)
Baseball
Golf (Men's & Women's)
Track and Field

Band

Home to the Winchester Community High School Marching Band THE FORCE.

ISSMA State Championships:
1974, 1975, 1977, 1978, 1979, 1980, 1986, and 1987.

Indiana State Fair Band Day Champion
1997, 2011, 2012, 2013, 2015, and 2016.

See also
 List of high schools in Indiana

References

External links
 Official website

Buildings and structures in Randolph County, Indiana
Schools in Randolph County, Indiana
Public high schools in Indiana
Winchester, Indiana